Parathyroid hormone 2 receptor is a protein that in humans is encoded by the PTH2R gene.

Function 

The protein encoded by this gene is a member of the G protein-coupled receptor family 2. This protein is a receptor for parathyroid hormone (PTH). This receptor is more selective in ligand recognition and has a more specific tissue distribution compared to parathyroid hormone 1 receptor (PTH1R). It is activated by PTH but not by parathyroid hormone-like hormone (PTHLH) and is particularly abundant in the brain and pancreas.

The molecular interaction of the PTH2 receptor with the peptide TIP39 has been characterized in full 3D molecular detail, identifying among other residues Tyr-318 in transmembrane helix 5 as a key residue for high affinity binding.

See also
 Parathyroid hormone receptor

References

Further reading

External links

 

G protein-coupled receptors